Sir William Fortescue (c. 1562–1629), of Salden House, in Mursley, Buckinghamshire and of Westminster and Clerkenwell, Middlesex, was an English politician.

He was a Member (MP) of the Parliament of England for Sudbury in 1593, for Chipping Wycombe in 1597 and for Stockbridge in 1604.

References

1560s births
1629 deaths
People from Buckinghamshire
People from Westminster
English MPs 1593
English MPs 1597–1598
English MPs 1604–1611
William